Sa is a letter of related and vertically oriented alphabets used to write Mongolic and Tungusic languages.

Mongolian language 

 Transcribes Chakhar , or  before ; Khalkha , or  before . Transliterated into Cyrillic with the letter .
 Derived from Old Uyghur merged samekh and shin ( and ).
 Produced with  using the Windows Mongolian keyboard layout.
 In the Mongolian Unicode block,  comes after  and before .

Notes

References 

Articles containing Mongolian script text
Mongolic letters
Mongolic languages
Tungusic languages